was a renowned Japanese photographer.

References

Japanese photographers
1907 births
2003 deaths